Babacar Camara (born October 15, 1981) is a Senegalese professional basketball player for Titánicos de León in Mexico.

Career overview
Babacar Camara grew up in Dakar, Senegal. After graduating from Yalla En High School in 1999, he went to Cheikh Anta Diop University for a short while before transferring to Cal.St.-Fullerton University where he played for the varsity basketball team for four years.
After graduating from there he played professional basketball with noteworthy performances especially for the Chinese team Jilin Northeast Tigers. He also played with Los Angeles D-Fenders and for many international teams.

Achievements
 2005 Senegal national basketball team

References

External links
 Eurobasket.com profile
 RealGM profile

1981 births
Living people
Cal State Fullerton Titans men's basketball players
Centers (basketball)
Cheikh Anta Diop University alumni
Gaiteros del Zulia players
Jilin Northeast Tigers players
Kagawa Five Arrows players
Kyoto Hannaryz players
Lechugueros de León players
Los Angeles D-Fenders players
Panteras de Aguascalientes players
Senegalese expatriate basketball people in China
Senegalese expatriate basketball people in Japan
Senegalese expatriate basketball people in Mexico
Senegalese expatriate basketball people in Qatar
Senegalese expatriate basketball people in Puerto Rico
Senegalese expatriate basketball people in Saudi Arabia
Senegalese expatriate basketball people in the United States
Senegalese expatriate basketball people in Venezuela
Senegalese men's basketball players
Basketball players from Dakar
Toyama Grouses players
Venados de Mazatlán (basketball) players